The 19311/19312 Indore–Pune Express via Panvel was an Express train of the Indian Railways, which runs between Indore, the largest city and commercial hub of Central Indian state Madhya Pradesh and Pune, the commercial hub of Maharashtra.

It was the second rail connection between Indore and Pune, other being Indore–Pune Superfast Express. This is first train from Indore to Navi Mumbai connecting Indore to Kalyan, Bhiwandi, Panvel, Karjat stations of Navi Mumbai. Currently it is not operational.

Coach composition

The train consists of 17 coaches:

 1 AC II Tier
 3 AC III Tier
 7 Sleeper class
 4 General Unreserved
 2 Seating cum Luggage Rake

Service

19311/Pune–Indore Express has an average speed of 54 km/hr and covers 966 km in 17 hrs 55 mins.
19312/Indore–Pune Express has an average speed of 49 km/hr and covers 966 km in 19 hrs 35 mins.

Route and halts

The important halts of the train are:

 
 
 
 
 
 
 
 
 
 
 
 
 
 Bhiwandi

Schedule

Traction

Both trains are hauled by a Vadodara Electric Loco Shed-based WAP-5 or WAP-4E electric locomotives.

See also

 Avantika Express
 Indore–Pune Superfast Express

References

Express trains in India
Transport in Indore
Transport in Pune
Railway services introduced in 2016
Rail transport in Madhya Pradesh
Rail transport in Maharashtra
2016 establishments in India